The Golaghat British Cemetery is a cemetery in India located on the premises opposite to Cally Coomer Doss & Co., adjacent to the circle office of Assam Power Distribution Company Limited at Golaghat, Assam. It is Assam's one of the oldest burial grounds dating back to India's pre-independence era, containing 28 burials of British officers of tea estates and their families, and is open for public viewing. 
 
The oldest grave in the cemetery is that of Capt. John Butler, then political agent who died at the age of 33 on January 7, 1876. Butler was one of the first British officers to lead expeditions to the Naga and Manipur hills. The cemetery also houses the grave of John Gordon McIntosh, then manager of Bukhial tea estate, who died in a plane crash on May 12, 1957. McIntosh, nicknamed Mac, had his own personal Aeronca chief single engine propeller airplane which he would fly himself, accompanied by his German shepherd.

Golaghat Municipal Board currently maintains the cemetery premises, besides preventing any land encroachment near the cemetery.

See also
 Golaghat district

References

External links
 

Heritage buildings and structures in Golaghat
1876 establishments in India
Cemeteries in India